Burmese Empire could refer to:
 Pagan Kingdom (849–1297), or "First Burmese Empire"
 Taungoo Dynasty (1486–1752), or "Second Burmese Empire"
 Konbaung Dynasty (1752–1885), or "Third Burmese Empire"